is a Japanese former professional baseball outfielder for the Chunichi Dragons in Japan's Nippon Professional Baseball. He played for the Dragons from 2001 to 2012. He is currently employed with the Dragons as the second team outfield and base-running coach.

External links

NBP

1976 births
Living people
Baseball people from Gifu Prefecture
Japanese baseball players
Nippon Professional Baseball outfielders
Chunichi Dragons players
Nippon Professional Baseball coaches
Japanese baseball coaches